Rosario is a Spanish and Portuguese surname.  Notable people with the surname include:

Amed Rosario, baseball player
Dante Rosario (born 1984), American football player in the National Football League
Eddie Rosario (born 1991), Puerto Rican baseball player
Edwin Rosario (1963–1997), Puerto Rican boxer
Eguy Rosario (born 1999), Dominican baseball player
Francisco Rosario (born 1980), Dominican retired baseball pitcher
Georben Rosario (born 1993), Air Traffic Controller
Gerardo Rosario (born 1952), Filipino swimmer
Hélder Rosário (born 1980), Portuguese footballer
Jerry Rosario (born 1952), Indian clergyman and theologian
Jimmy Rosario (born 1945), Puerto Rican baseball player
JoAnn Rosario, American gospel singer
Joe Rosario (born 1959), American actor
Joel Rosario (born 1985), Dominican horse jockey
José Rosario (born 1967), Puerto Rican politician
Joseph Albert Rosario (1915–2011), Indian clergyman
Liam Rosario (born 2006) First ever Jr. Street Scooter Champion at World Skate Games
Márcio Rosário (born 1983), Brazilian footballer
Mel Rosario (born 1973), Dominican retired baseball catcher
Nelly Rosario (born 1972), Dominican-American novelist
Nelson Rosario (born 1989), American football player in the National Football League
Pablo Rosario (born 1997), Dutch footballer of Dominican descent
Paul Brian Rosario (born 1982), Filipino sport shooter
Rainel Rosario, professional baseball player
Ralphi Rosario, American house musician
Ramón Rosario (1927–2014), Puerto Rican shot putter
Robert Rosario (born 1966), English footballer
Rodrigo Rosario (born 1978), Dominican retired baseball pitcher
Sandy Rosario (born 1985), Dominican baseball pitcher
Santiago Rosario (1939–2013), Puerto Rican baseball player
Shirley Rosario, American poker player
Toño Rosario (born 1955), Dominican merengue musician, previous member of Los Hermanos Rosario
Troy Rosario (born 1992), Filipino basketball player
Vernon Rosario (born 1962), American psychiatrist and medical historian
Víctor Rosario (born 1966), Dominican retired baseball player
Virgilio Rosario (1499–1559), Italian clergyman
Wilin Rosario (born 1989), Dominican baseball catcher
Willie Rosario (born 1930), Puerto Rican salsa musician
Jonathan Rosario (born 1990), Filipino habitual line stepper

See also
Del Rosario (surname), also includes the Portuguese equivalent do Rosário
Rosario (disambiguation)
Ángel Rosario Cabada (1872–1921), Mexican agrarian leader
Cleverson Rosário dos Santos (born 1983), Brazilian footballer
Dwayne De Rosario (born 1978), Canadian soccer (football) player
 Jayson Rosario (born 1995), Filipino, Medical Laboratory Scientist

Spanish-language surnames
Surnames of Spanish origin